Yury Viktorovich Styopkin (born 15 October 1971) is a Russian judoka.

Achievements

External links
 
 

1971 births
Living people
Russian male judoka
Judoka at the 2000 Summer Olympics
Olympic judoka of Russia
Olympic bronze medalists for Russia
Olympic medalists in judo
Medalists at the 2000 Summer Olympics
Universiade medalists in judo
Universiade gold medalists for Russia
Universiade bronze medalists for Russia